Lieutenant General Len Meyer was a South African Army general, who served as Chief of Staff Personnel for the Defence Force.

Military career
He served as Deputy Chief of the Army from 1988 to 1989. In 1989, he was appointed to the Defence Headquarters as the Chief of Staff Personnel, a post he held until 1991.

References

South African Army generals
Year of birth missing
Year of death missing